VetAgro Sup (officially, the Institut national d'enseignement supérieur et de recherche en alimentation, santé animale, sciences agronomiques et de l'environnement ) is a French engineering college created in 2010.

The school trains engineers in :

 Agronomy / environment / health ;
 Food / nutrition / health / management ;
 Sustainable territorial development ;
 Engineering and animal models for health.

Located in Marcy-l'Étoile, close to Lyon, as well as Lempdes, close to Clermont-Ferrand, VetAgro Sup is a public higher education institution. The school is a member of the University of Lyon University Group.

Notable alumni 
 Gérard Larcher, a French politician

References

External links
 VetAgro Sup

Engineering universities and colleges in France
Clermont-Ferrand
VetAgro Sup
Lyon
Educational institutions established in 2010
2010 establishments in France